Calder is a small crater on Mercury.  Its name was adopted by the International Astronomical Union (IAU) in 2013. Calder is named for the American sculptor Alexander Calder.

References

Impact craters on Mercury